The Ashville Formation is a geological formation in Saskatchewan and Manitoba whose strata date back to the Late Cretaceous. Dinosaur remains are among the fossils that have been recovered from the formation.

It is geochronologically equivalent to the Lower Colorado Group and the Viking Formation in central Alberta.

Vertebrate paleofauna
Pasquiaornis hardiei - "Hindlimb elements."
Pasquiaornis tankei - "Hindlimb elements and quadrate."

See also

 List of dinosaur-bearing rock formations

References

External links

Upper Cretaceous Series of North America